Long Lane, London, England may be:

 Long Lane, City of London
 Long Lane, Southwark